Xylan is a fluoropolymer-based industrial coating, most commonly used in non-stick cookware. Generally, it is applied in a thin film to the target material to improve its durability and non-stick properties.

Development
Consumer demand for non-stick coatings with improved durability drove research in the 1960s. DuPont, at that time focused on improving housewares, developed important properties of nonstick coatings through research. DuPont scientists found that adding Fluorinated ethylene propylene to the hard, adhesion-promoting binder resins produced one-coat products that were more durable than earlier Teflon formulations. In 1969, when Xylan was developed, Tefal and Teflon accounted for nearly all of the fluoropolymer coatings industry.

Applications
Xylan is generally used to reduce friction, improve wear resistance, and for non-stick applications. Additionally, it can be used to protect a metal from corrosion. The most commonly known application is in non-stick cookware but Xylan coatings have also been used extensively in the automotive industry and for corrosion protection in the oil and gas industry.

Xylan is the umbrella trademark for most of the Whitford Corporation fluoropolymer coatings line. Xylan is made of low friction, wear resistant composites of fluoropolymers and reinforcing binder resins. Xylan coatings can be one-, two- (primer and top-coat), and three- (primer, mid-coat, top-coat) coat conventional and reinforced (filled) coating systems.

The fluoropolymers utilized in Xylan coatings consist of PTFE, PFA, and FEP. The properties listed below may not apply to all Xylan coatings as the fluoropolymer and resin content and type can have significant effects on each property.

Properties

References

Coatings